Qillwani (Aymara qillwa, qiwña, qiwlla Andean gull, -ni a suffix to indicate ownership, "the one with the Andean gull", also spelled Kelluani, Quellhuani, Quelluani) is a  mountain in the Cordillera Real in the Andes of Bolivia. It is located in the La Paz Department, Larecaja Province, near the western border of the Guanay Municipality. It lies southeast of Ch'iyar Juqhu, northwest of Chachakumani and northeast of Patapatani.

Qillwani (Kellhuani) is also the name of the river which originates southwest of the mountain. Its waters flow to Lake Titicaca along the village of Qillwani (Kellhuani, Kellwani).

References 

Mountains of La Paz Department (Bolivia)